Swapnapheri is a Bengali theatre group. The theatre group was founded on 21 February 2001.  Swapnapheri has been marked by the acting and directorial of Dr. Debabrata Chakraborty and the Organization Secretary Biswarup Chatterjee.

Performance
From 2001, Swapnapheri began performing on a regular basis. This eliminated their need to wait in the queue for free slots at the major theatres like the Academy of Fine Arts, Shilpokala Academy etc.

Major productions
                                 
                                 
                                 
Till April, 2012 Swapnapheri has performed many plays. Some of those are listed below:
Charandas Choor by Debabrata Chakraborty
Murti by Debabrata Chakraborty
Kichukkhon by Debabrata Chakraborty
Raja (Rabindra Natayak) by Debabrata Chakraborty
Basanta Utsav (Rabindra Natayak)by Debabrata Chakraborty
Taser Desh (Rabindra Natayak) by Biswarup Chatterjee
Sesher Ratri (Rabindra Natayak)by Debabrata Chakraborty
Ghu Ghu by Debabrata Chakraborty
Vulval NEWS by Biswarup Chatterjee
Ayna by Biswarup Chatterjee

Committee and members
                                 
                                 
                                 

President  :  Dr. Debabrata Chakraborty
Secretary  :  Biswarup Chatterjee 
Accountant :  Debjani Chakraborty

Members
 Biswarup Chatterjee, Dr Debabrata Chakraborty, Syed Merazul Hoque, Debjani Chakraborty, Rashedul Islam Khan, Debabrata Roy, Rimi Akter, Shruti Das, Sourabh Poyra, Tanmoy Biswas, Suman Das, Abdul Rahaman Biswas, Mousumi Dutta, Emdadul Hoque Milon, Aninda Das, Tanmoy Chowdhury, Toukir Ahmed

References

Bengali culture
Culture of Kolkata
Organisations based in Dhaka
Bengali theatre groups